William Fitzwilliam, 2nd Baron Fitzwilliam MP (c.1609 – 21 February 1658) was an English nobleman and politician who sat in the House of Commons of England between 1640 and 1653.

Fitzwilliam was the son of William Fitzwilliam, 1st Baron Fitzwilliam (1577–1643) and his wife Catherine Hyde (1574–1643).

In April 1640, Fitzwilliam was elected Member of Parliament for Peterborough in the Short Parliament. He was re-elected in November 1640 for the Long Parliament where he remained throughout its duration. Fitzwilliam inherited the peerage on the death of his father in 1643. 
 
Fitzwilliam died at the age of 49.

On 11 Jul 1638 Fitzwilliam married Jane Hunter Perry (1611-8 Apr 1671), daughter of Hugh Perry and his wife Catherine Fenn. Their son William succeeded to the title and was later created Earl Fitzwilliam. Their daughter Jane FitzWilliam (1646-1679) married Sir Christopher Wren.

References

1609 births
1658 deaths
English MPs 1640 (April)
English MPs 1640–1648
English MPs 1648–1653
Barons in the Peerage of Ireland